In mathematics, strict differentiability is a modification of the usual notion of differentiability of functions that is particularly suited to p-adic analysis. In short, the definition is made more restrictive by allowing both points used in the difference quotient to "move".

Basic definition 
The simplest setting in which strict differentiability can be considered, is that of a real-valued function defined on an interval I of the real line.
The function f:I → R is said strictly differentiable in a point a ∈ I if

A strictly differentiable function is obviously differentiable, but the converse is wrong, as can be seen from the counter-example

 

One has however the equivalence of strict differentiability on an interval I, and being of differentiability class  (i.e. continuously differentiable).

In analogy with the Fréchet derivative, the previous definition can be generalized to the case where R is replaced by a Banach space E (such as ), and requiring existence of a continuous linear map L such that

where  is defined in a natural way on E × E.

Motivation from p-adic analysis 

In the p-adic setting, the usual definition of the derivative fails to have certain desirable properties. For instance, it is possible for a function that is not locally constant to have zero derivative everywhere. An example of this is furnished by the function F: Zp → Zp, where Zp is the ring of p-adic integers, defined by
 
One checks that the derivative of F, according to usual definition of the derivative, exists and is zero everywhere, including at x = 0. That is, for any x in Zp,
 
Nevertheless F fails to be locally constant at the origin.

The problem with this function is that the difference quotients
 
do not approach zero for x and y close to zero. For example, taking x = pn − p2n and y = pn, we have
 
which does not approach zero. The definition of strict differentiability avoids this problem by imposing a condition directly on the difference quotients.

Definition in p-adic case 

Let K be a complete extension of Qp (for example K = Cp), and let X be a subset of K with no isolated points. Then a function F :  X → K is said to be strictly differentiable at x = a if the limit
 
exists.

References 
 

Number theory